Trophon coulmanensis is a species of sea snail, a marine gastropod mollusk in the family Muricidae, the murex snails or rock snails.

Description

Distribution
It can be found in the South Shetland Islands.

References

Gastropods described in 1907
Trophon